Braulio Salazar (1917–2008) was a Venezuelan painter.

Biography 

Salazar was born on 23 December 1917 in Valencia. His first exhibition took place in 1935. As he suffered from hemotitis, doctors banned him from using chemical products. This lead him to make up his own colours with earth, vegetables and other natural substances as his other compatriot, Armando Reverón, used to do.

Salazar was arts teacher at the Pedro Gual high school, at the Simón Rodríguez schoon and at the School of Plastic Arts Arturo Michelena. He also was the head of the Art Workshop at the Department of Humanities in the Faculty of Engineering of the University of Carabobo.

He obtained the National Prize of Plastic Arts of Venezuela in 1976. He won the Arturo Michelena Prize, the most prestigious arts prize in Venezuela, in 1948 and 1963.

The Museum of Modern Arts of Valencia is named after him.

References

External links 
 Biography in the site of the Central Bank of Venezuela (Spanish)
 Site of the Braulio Salazar Gallery

People from Valencia, Venezuela
1917 births
2008 deaths
20th-century Venezuelan painters
20th-century Venezuelan male artists
Male painters